Ramaz Noyevich Kharshiladze (January 16, 1951 – September 11, 2017) was a Georgian judoka who competed for the Soviet Union in the 1976 Summer Olympics. In 1976 he won the silver medal in the half-heavyweight class. He was bronze medalist at the World Championships in Vienna in 1975. He was also the bronze medalist at the European Championships in Vienna in 1980.

References 
 
 
 Ramaz Kharshiladze's obituary 

1951 births
2017 deaths
Male judoka from Georgia (country)
Soviet male judoka
Olympic judoka of the Soviet Union
Judoka at the 1976 Summer Olympics
Olympic silver medalists for the Soviet Union
Olympic medalists in judo
Medalists at the 1976 Summer Olympics